Arkadiusz "Arek" Radomski (born 27 June 1977) is a Polish former professional footballer who played as a holding midfielder. He last played for Cracovia.

Career
Radomski started his career in Mieszko Gniezno in 1993. He played only two matches in Polish First League. In Dutch League from 1994 to 2005 he played 307 matches and scored 19 goals at this time. In 2006 won Austrian Championship and Austrian Cup with his club FK Austria Wien. He was selected to the 23-men national team for the 2006 FIFA World Cup finals in Germany.

References

External links
 

1977 births
Living people
People from Gniezno
Polish footballers
Lech Poznań players
SC Veendam players
SC Heerenveen players
FK Austria Wien players
NEC Nijmegen players
MKS Cracovia (football) players
Austrian Football Bundesliga players
Eredivisie players
Eerste Divisie players
Ekstraklasa players
Poland international footballers
2006 FIFA World Cup players
Polish expatriate footballers
Polish expatriate sportspeople in Austria
Expatriate footballers in Austria
Polish expatriate sportspeople in the Netherlands
Expatriate footballers in the Netherlands
Sportspeople from Greater Poland Voivodeship
Association football midfielders